Schizo is a 1976 British psychological horror slasher film directed and produced by Pete Walker and starring Lynne Frederick.

Plot
Samantha Gray (Lynne Frederick), a famous figure skater, is engaged to London businessman Alan Falconer (John Leyton). On the day of Alan and Samantha's wedding, ex-convict William Haskin (Jack Watson) begins stalking Samantha. Over the next few days, Haskin terrifies Samantha by leaving bloody knives in various locations, including her home.

Samantha tells her psychiatrist friend, Leonard Hawthorne (John Fraser), that Haskin was her mother's lover until he brutally stabbed her to death during an argument. Now that Haskin has been released from prison, Samantha thinks that he is trying to kill her. That night, Leonard is found murdered in his car, his throat slashed.

Samantha's housekeeper, Mrs Wallace (Queenie Watts), takes Samantha to see her daughter Joy (Trisha Mortimer), a medium who channels Leonard's spirit and warns Samantha that the killer is close by. While making her way home, Joy is bludgeoned with a hammer and thrown under a moving bus. At Samantha's house, Samantha finds Mrs Wallace dead in the cellar, stabbed through the head.

Samantha confronts Haskin at Alan's factory. Haskin tells Samantha that he is not a murderer and was wrongfully convicted: Samantha has a split personality, part of which is murderous, and killed her own mother. He explains that the bloody knives were intended as clues to force her to remember and confess. A physical struggle ensues, which ends with Haskin being fatally impaled on one of the factory machines.

Some time later, Alan and Samantha depart for their honeymoon. Unknown to Alan, Samantha has packed a knife in her luggage.

Cast

Lynne Frederick as Samantha Gray
John Leyton as Alan Falconer
Stephanie Beacham as Beth
John Fraser as Leonard Hawthorne
Jack Watson as William Haskin
Queenie Watts as Mrs Wallace
Trisha Mortimer as Joy
John McEnery as Stephens (uncredited)
Paul Alexander as Peter McAllister
Robert Mill as Maitre d'
Diana King as Mrs Falconer
Colin Jeavons as Commissioner
Victor Winding as Sergeant
Raymond Bowers as Manager
Pearl Hackney as Woman at seance
Terry Duggan as Editor
Lindsay Campbell as Falconer
Wendy Gilmore as Samantha's mother
Primi Townsend as Secretary
Victoria Allum as Young Samantha

Production

Filming
The film was made in London in mid-1976.

Lynne Frederick had known director Pete Walker since she was 14 years old (her mother was a friend and co-worker of Walker). However, Schizo is the only film that they worked on together.

Frederick started work on the film just days after wrapping on Voyage of the Damned (1976). When Frederick was cast, Walker was under the impression that she still had her trademark long hair. Unbeknownst to him, Frederick had cut it short for her previous role in Voyage of the Damned.

Due to the film's low budget, many of Frederick's clothes came from her own personal wardrobe. Frederick had worn many of these outfits the previous year in A Long Return (1975).

Music
The music was composed and conducted by Stanley Myers.

Release
The release of Schizo (1976) was rushed to coincide with the anticipated success of Frederick’s highly acclaimed performance in Voyage of the Damned (1976). It was hoped that the success of that film would garner a following for Frederick and bring in extra earnings for this film. Ultimately this plan backfired and the film was released in the UK on 11 November 1976, nearly a month before Voyage of the Damned, and did not generate the desired buzz.

The film received a release in the US on 7 December 1977.

Critical response
Writing for The Monthly Film Bulletin, Tom Milne was critical of the film, commenting that it "trudges wearily into a morass of evasions and red herrings [...] to obscure the fact, obvious from the very start, that beleaguered heroine and bloodthirsty killer are one and the same." He added that the direction ("all thump, scream and cut as shadows lurk and doorknobs turn") "reduces the whole thing to risible absurdity".

Time Out wrote: "Walker and writer David McGillivray's most ambitious project to date attempts to shake off the low-budget horror/exploitation tag with a move into more up-market psychological suspense. If the formula is thread-worn – a trail of victimisation, sexual paranoia, and murder in the wake of the heroine's wedding - at least some effort is made to locate it (rich, middle-class London). But things collapse disastrously in the second half. Caught between sending itself up and taking itself seriously, the film ends closer to the silliness of Francis Durbridge than to the menace of Alfred Hitchcock."

Home media

Legacy
Although the film was not a success during its initial release, it became a cult classic in the horror movie community. The underground success of the film was in part due to Lynne Frederick’s new found cult fanbase. This film, along with Vampire Circus (1971), helped establish Frederick as a scream queen icon of the 1970s.

References

External links
 

1976 films
1976 horror films
1976 independent films
1970s slasher films
British independent films
British slasher films
Films about dissociative identity disorder
Films about weddings
Films directed by Pete Walker
Films scored by Stanley Myers
Films set in London
Films shot in London
Matricide in fiction
1970s English-language films
1970s British films